Arthur Hando (6 June 1891 – 14 February 1949) was an Australian rules footballer who played for the South Melbourne Football Club in the Victorian Football League (VFL).

Recruited from Victorian Football Association (VFA) club Brunswick, Hando made his senior VFL debut in 1922. He was once reported for shaking the goalpost while Cliff Rankin was preparing to shoot for goal.

Following the end of his VFL career, Hando captain-coached Bendigo Football League (BFL) club South Bendigo, leading them to the 1925 premiership.

Notes

Sources
 Blair, L. (2005) Immortals, John Wiley & Sons Australia: Milton, Qld. .

External links 

1891 births
1949 deaths
Australian rules footballers from Victoria (Australia)
Sydney Swans players
Brunswick Football Club players
South Bendigo Football Club players
South Bendigo Football Club coaches